The 2020 season is the 144th season of competitive soccer in Canada. Due to the COVID-19 pandemic in Canada, several competitions were cancelled or shortened.

National teams 

When available, the home team or the team that is designated as the home team is listed in the left column; the away team is in the right column.

Senior Men

Friendlies

Senior Women

Men's domestic club leagues

Canadian Premier League 

Eight teams play in this league, all of which are based in Canada. It is considered a Division 1 men's league in the Canadian soccer league system.

League1 Ontario (Men) 

No League1 Ontario matches were played in 2020.

Première Ligue de Soccer du Québec

Canadian Soccer League

Men's international club leagues

Major League Soccer 

Three Canadian teams (Montreal Impact, Toronto FC, and Vancouver Whitecaps FC) play in this league, which also contains 23 teams from the United States.  It is considered a Division 1 men's league in the United States soccer league system.

Overall standings

USL League One 

One Canadian team (Toronto FC II) plays in this league, which also contains nine teams from the United States. It is considered a Division 3 men's league in the United States soccer league system.

USL League Two 

Not played.

Women's club leagues

National Women's Soccer League 

No Canadian teams play in this league, though players from the Canada women's national soccer team are allocated to its teams by the Canadian Soccer Association.  It is considered a Division 1 women's league in the United States soccer league system.

United Women's Soccer 

Not played.

League1 Ontario (Women) 
Not played.

Première Ligue de soccer du Québec (Women) 

Four teams played in this league (after four other withdrew), all of which are based in Canada.  It is considered a Division 3 women's league in the Canadian soccer league system.

Standings 

Championship Match

Third Place Match

Domestic cups 
The Challenge Trophy and Jubilee Trophy were not contested in 2020.

Canadian Championship 

The Canadian Championship is a national cup contested by men's teams in divisions 1 through 3. In 2020, the championship consisted of a single match between a Canadian Premier League team and a Major League Soccer team.

Canadian clubs in international competition

2020 CONCACAF Champions League

2020 CONCACAF League

References

External links 
 Canadian Soccer Association

2020 in Canadian soccer
Seasons in Canadian soccer
2020 sport-related lists